Karine Legault (born August 4, 1978) is a former freestyle swimmer who competed for Canada at the 2000 Summer Olympics in Sydney, Australia.  There she ended up in 16th place in the women's 800-metre freestyle, clocking 8:43.56 in the preliminary heats.  She also competed in the preliminary heats of the 400-metre freestyle, and finished 19th with a time of 4:15.55.

Her older brother Hugues Legault also competed in swimming, and represented Canada at the 1996 Summer Olympics.

References
 sports-reference

1978 births
Living people
Canadian female freestyle swimmers
Olympic swimmers of Canada
People from Saint-Eustache, Quebec
Sportspeople from Quebec
Swimmers at the 2000 Summer Olympics